Picconia azorica, locally known as pau-branco, is a species of Picconia common to the majority of islands of the Portuguese archipelago of the Azores, where it is endemic. It can grow to a medium-sized tree, though it is usually found in the form of a shrub. It is threatened by habitat loss.

Description
Leaves are lanceolate or ovate, opposite and with entire margins. It flowers from March to July, producing small white flowers in axillary clusters.

Status
The species is very popular in traditional/artesnal carpentry, for furniture construction and religious sanctuary.

Since its colonization, the resources of the different islands of the Azores were used to sustain its population. This meant that the forests were also cut-down to support the local economy and day-to-day activities, and other non-endemic species planted to support growing populations, such as the Cryptomeria (Cryptomeria japonica) and the Acacia (Acacia dealbata) (which were quick growing in the habitats of the islands).

Overexploitation of the wood led to the species becoming almost extinct in some islands. It has become a priority for re-population and conservation, listed as endangered on the IUCN Red List 2004, and Annex II of the Habitats Directive (Berne Convention on the Conservation of European Wildlife and Natural Habitats), due to habitat degradation, expansion of agricultural land, forestation, competition by invader species and isolation of populations.

References
Notes

Sources
  
 

azorica
Endangered plants
Endemic flora of the Azores
Taxonomy articles created by Polbot
Plants described in 1933